The Latvia men's national tennis team represents Latvia in Davis Cup tennis competition and are governed by the Latvian Tennis Union. Team is coached by Ģirts Dzelde.

Latvia after winning tie against Slovenia returned to the Europe/Africa Zone of Group I. They previously played in the Group I 2008.

History
Latvia competed in its first Davis Cup in 1993. Latvian players had previously represented the USSR.

Current team (2022) 

 Ernests Gulbis
 Robert Strombachs
 Kārlis Ozoliņš
 Daniels Tens (Junior player)
 Miķelis Lībietis (Doubles player)

Former players

Results

See also
Davis Cup
Latvia Fed Cup team

External links

Davis Cup teams
Davis Cup
Davis Cup